Cornwallis was a French vessel launched in 1802 that came into British hands in 1803. Under a sequence of owners she traded with the West Indies, Spain, the Cape of Good Hope, and Singapore. She is last listed in 1834.

Career
Bristol-based Archibald Robe and Co. purchased the French prize in 1803 and named her Cornwall1s. She entered Lloyd's Register in 1804 with J. Baker, master, and Robe & Co., owners. Her trade was Bristol-Surinam. James Baker received a letter of marque for the snow Cornwallis on 22 December 1803. 

Baker was her master for 1804-5, and then Alleyne replaced him. One source states that in 1806 Robe & Co. sold Cornwallis to Smith & Co., after she had made three voyages to the West Indies for Robe & Co. However, the first indicator of a change of owner and master occurs in the 1809 volume of the Register of Shipping. The new master was J. Thomas, and the new owner Smith & Co. Her trade became London-Cadiz. On 21 November 1809 James Thomas received a letter of marque.

The 1811 Register of Shipping shows Cornwalliss master changing to W. Daldy and her owner to I. Williams. Her trade changed to London-Gibraltar. In 1814, her burthen changes from 186 to 177 tons. Thereafter her burthen is 177 or 179 tons, depending on the year. She is no longer armed after mid-1816.

On 26 October 1825, Cornwallis sailed for Singapore. Cornwallis left Singapore on 7 May 1826 and was off Hastings by 2 October.

In 1826 Henderson purchased Cornwallis. She then underwent a thorough repair. A list of ships trading to India and eastward of the Cape of Good Hope showed Cornwallis, Edmond Henderson, master, and G.E. Henderson, owner, scheduled to sail from London Docks on 3 December 1828 for the Cape.

The last listing for Cornwallis in the Register of Shipping is in 1833. It shows Henderson, master, and Henderson, owner. For her trade it simply lists "London". The entry in the 1834 volume of Lloyd's Register simply lists Henderson as master and trade as London. This is the last listing for Cornwallis.

Notes, citations and references
Notes

Citations

References
Buckingham, James Silk, ed. (1826) The Oriental Herald and Journal of General Literature, Volume 11. (J. M. Richardson).  
Farr, Grahame E., ed. (1950) Records of Bristol Ships, 1800-1838 (vessels over 150 tons). (Bristol Record Society), Vol. 15.

1802 ships
Ships built in France
Captured ships
Age of Sail merchant ships
Merchant ships of the United Kingdom